Don't Be Afraid of Love is the second studio album by Lo Fidelity Allstars, originally released on Skint Records in 2002. It features guest appearances from Jamie Lidell, Greg Dulli, and Bootsy Collins.

Track listing

Personnel 
Credits adapted from liner notes.

 Lo Fidelity Allstars (Andy Dickinson, Johnny Machin, Dale Maloney, Phil Ward, Martin Whiteman) – production
 Phil Ward – vocals
 Martin Whiteman – vocals
 Jamie Lidell – vocals
 Lisa Millett – vocals
 Andy Dickinson – vocals
 Sanj Sen – production
 Damian Harris – production
 Greg Dulli – vocals, guitar
 Des Davies – guitar
 The Bongtronic Radio Orchestra and Chorus – noises, shouts
 Bootsy Collins – vocals
 Jonathan Enright – trombone
 Mick Ball – trumpet
 DJ Hyste – turntables
 Sen Phillips – feedback

Charts

References

External links 
 
 

2002 albums
Lo Fidelity Allstars albums
Skint Records albums